Johan Otto Wilhelm Wrede (born 18 October 1935) is a Finnish literary historian.

He was born in Helsinki. He took his doctorate in 1965 and subsequently worked three years for the Humanist Commission. In 1968 he became a docent of Swedish literature at the University of Helsinki, advancing to professor already in 1969 and serving until 1995. Among his academic specialities were J. L. Runeberg.

Wrede served as vice prorector of the University of Helsinki from 1983 to 1989, and was a board member of the Society of Swedish Literature in Finland from 1967 to 2000, the last eight years as chairman. He is a member of the Norwegian Academy of Science and Letters. He was awarded the Swedish Academy Finland Prize in 1991.

References

Further reading
 

1935 births
Living people
Swedish-speaking Finns
Finnish literary historians
Academic staff of the University of Helsinki
Members of the Norwegian Academy of Science and Letters